QinetiQ Pershore is a Business Park and Trials Centre operated by QinetiQ. The site is located near the village of Throckmorton, Worcestershire, England.

History

The site was created during 1933/4 for use by the Royal Air Force as a training station under the name of RAF Pershore.

The following units were posted here at some point:
 No. 1 Aircraft Preparation Unit RAF
 No. 1 Ferry Unit RAF
 No. 10 (Advanced) Flying Training School RAF
 No. 23 Operational Training Unit RAF with Vickers Wellingtons.
 No. 50 Gliding School RAF
 No. 1516 (Beam Approach Training) Flight RAF
 No. 1681 (Bomber) Defence Training Flight RAF
 Radar Research Flying Unit RAF (RRFU). - previously at RAF Defford

The RAF station closed down during 1978.

Current use

The site is currently a Business Park and Trials Centre.

It has occasionally been opened as an aerodrome, hosting an airshow. The last such event was scheduled for 11 June 2016.

References

Pershore
Military installations of the United Kingdom
Research institutes in Worcestershire